Point is the fourteenth studio album by the Swiss electronic duo Yello. It was released on 4 September 2020 on Universal Music.

Reception
Joe Muggs of The Arts Desk wrote, "And so, another Yello album, and yes, it sounds like classic Yello. Maier’s vocals were always predicated on an eerie inhumanity – electronic cut-ups and processing making him infernally robotic, a kind of ludic counterpoint to fellow synthpop pioneers Kraftwerk’s deadpanning." Ben Hogwood of musicOMH commented, "Pop music is supposed to be fun. That was the immediate reaction on listening to Point, the 14th album from Swiss electronic music pioneers Yello. The two – Dieter Meier and Boris Blank – could never be accused of taking themselves too seriously, and it is a pleasure to report nothing has changed."

Track listing

Personnel
Jeremy Baer – guitar
Boris Blank – vocals
Dieter Meier – vocals
Fifi Rong – vocals

Charts

References

External links

2020 albums
Yello albums
Universal Records albums